Ben Cutmore (born 10 March 2003) is an English diver who represents Great Britain.

Career 
Cutmore was born in Cambridge, but moved to London to train at the London Aquatics Centre.

2022 
At the 2022 FINA Diving Grand Prix in Calgary, Cutmore won the silver medal in the 10 metre synchronised platform with partner Kyle Kothari. At the 2022 Commonwealth Games held in Birmingham, Cutmore placed fourth in the 10 metre synchronised platform. At the 2022 European Aquatics Championships in Rome, he won gold in the 10 metre synchronised platform.

References

2003 births
Living people
English male divers
British male divers
Divers at the 2022 Commonwealth Games
European Games competitors for Great Britain
Sportspeople from London
21st-century British people
Commonwealth Games competitors for England